San Buenaventura District is one of seven districts of the province Canta in Peru.

See also 
 Ch'akiqucha

References